The Boulevard du Temple photograph of 1838 (or possibly 1839) is one of the earliest daguerrotype plates produced by Louis Daguerre. Although the image seems to be of a deserted street, it is widely considered to be the first photograph to include an image of a human.

Daguerrotype
The earliest known photograph, the heliographic View from the Window at Le Gras, had been produced some ten years earlier using a technique that required an exposure time of some eight hours which meant that only static objects could be recorded. However, by 1838 Daguerre had developed his own method whereby the exposure was reduced to only four to five minutes.

This was at a time before the Place de la République had been built and the location is where now  joins the Place de la République. The Boulevard du Temple would have been busy with people and horse traffic but because an exposure time of four to five minutes would have been required the only people recorded were two keeping still – a bootblack and his customer at the corner of the street shown at lower left of the plate.

Publication and exhibition
Daguerre first publicly announced his invention to the French Académie des Sciences in January 1839 but in March 1839 a fire at his studio destroyed almost all of his daguerrotypes leaving only about 25 which can be definitely attributed to him.

In October 1839, as a publicity effort, he presented King Ludwig I of Bavaria with a framed triptych of his work in which this photograph was the right hand image.
This image was labelled as having been taken at huit heures du matin and a very similar plate was mounted in the left panel marked as midi.  The images were both taken on the same day, either in 1838 or 1839, together with a third plate which has since been lost. The triptych was put on display at the Munich Arts Association where they immediately attracted attention with the Leipzig Pfennig-Magazin saying of the 8 am image that there appeared to be a man having his boots polished who must have been standing extremely still. 

The images were stored at the royal palace and later at the Bayerisches Nationalmuseum archives where they gradually deteriorated until in 1936 or 1937 the American historian of photography Beaumont Newhall rediscovered them and made reproductions for display in New York. In 1949 he published them in his book The History of Photography from 1839 to the present Day. During World War II the original daguerrotypes were kept in poor conditions until in 1970 they were placed on loan with the Munich Stadtmuseum. Restoration was attempted but with disastrous results. Since then daguerreotype facsimiles have been produced from Newhall's copies.

Analysis

Various people have scrutinised the image to see if there are traces of any other activity. There may be faint images of other people and possibly a child looking out of a window, and a horse.

As with all Daguerre's plates, the picture is mirror image. Bearing this in mind the camera location and angle have been analysed.

There may have been photographs of people before 1838. Hippolyte Bayard claimed to have taken photographic self-portraits in 1837 but these have not survived. There are other daguerrotypes, both portraits and possibly by Daguerre, that might also date from 1837. The self-portrait by the American Robert Cornelius was taken in 1839.

See also
History of photography
History of photographic lens design
List of photographs considered the most important

References

Further reading

French inventions
1838 works
1830s photographs
Black-and-white photographs
Photography in France